Percy Alfred Helton (January 31, 1894 – September 11, 1971) was an American stage, film, and television actor. He was one of the most familiar faces and voices in Hollywood of the 1950s.

Career 
A Manhattan native, Helton began acting at the age of two, appearing in vaudeville acts with his British-born father, William Alfred "Alf" Helton. He was a cast member in the Broadway production of Julie BonBon (1906). Helton went on to perform in stock theater and in other Broadway plays.

Helton joined the United States Army in World War I. Deployed to Europe with the American Expeditionary Forces, he was awarded the Distinguished Service Cross for his duty with the 77th Infantry Division's 305th Field Artillery.

A change in his voice altered Helton's career. He remained in acting but chiefly as a character actor in a wide range of films and television programs in the 1950s and 1960s. Among those programs were three guest appearances on Perry Mason, including the role of Asa Cooperman in the 1961 episode "The Case of the Pathetic Patient", as a pawn broker in the 1961 episode "The Case of the Torrid Tapestry" and as a hotel clerk in the 1965 episode "The Case of the Careless Kitten."

Films in which he performed include Miracle on 34th Street (1947), Criss Cross (1949), The Set-Up (1949), Kiss Me Deadly (1955), and as "Sweetface" in Butch Cassidy and the Sundance Kid (1969). He co-starred in several films noir, including Wicked Woman (1953).

Personal life and death
 
Helton died at age 77 at the Hollywood Presbyterian Medical Center on September 11, 1971, the year of his final film appearance. His ashes are inurned at Pierce Brothers Westwood Village Memorial Park and Mortuary in Los Angeles, California.

Partial filmography 

The Fairy and the Waif (1915) as The Waif
The Flower of Faith (1916) as Tom Judson
The Master Mind (1920) as Younger brother
Silver Wings (1922) as John (play)
Insinuation (1922) as Jimmie
The Offenders (1922) 
Frankie and Johnny (1936) as Undetermined role (uncredited)
Miracle on 34th Street (1947) as Drunken Santa Claus (uncredited)
Call Northside 777 (1948) as William Decker - Mailman (uncredited)
Let's Live Again (1948) as Mr. President
Hazard (1948) as Beady Robbins 
Larceny (1948) as Charlie Jordan
That Wonderful Urge (1948) as Monroe Township Jail Drunk (uncredited)
Chicken Every Sunday (1949) as Mr. Sawyer (uncredited)
Criss Cross (1949) as Frank
Alias Nick Beal (1949) as Lawyer (uncredited)
The Set-Up (1949) as Red
The Crooked Way (1949) as Petey
Lust for Gold (1949) as Barber (uncredited)
Red, Hot and Blue (1949) as Mr. Perkins, Stage manager
Abbott & Costello Meet The Killer, Boris Karloff (1949) as Abernathy
Thieves' Highway (1949) as Roadside Bar Manager (uncredited)
My Friend Irma (1949) as Mr. Clyde
Free for All (1949) as Joe Hershey
The Secret Fury (1950) as Justice of the Peace Roy T. Palmer (uncredited)
Tyrant of the Sea (1950) as Crewman (uncredited)
Harbor of Missing Men (1950) as 'Rummy' Davis
Wabash Avenue (1950) as Ship Captain (uncredited)
Riding High (1950) as Pawnbroker (uncredited)
Fancy Pants (1950) as Mayor Fogarty (uncredited)
A Life of Her Own (1950) as Hamburger Proprietor (uncredited)
Copper Canyon (1950) as 'Scamper' Joad
The Sun Sets at Dawn (1950) as Reporter, Feature Syndicate
Cyrano de Bergerac (1950) as Bellerose
Under Mexicali Stars (1950) as Nap Wellington
Three Guys Named Mike (1951) as Mr. Hawkins, Hotel Manager
Inside Straight (1951) as Lawyer Anderson (uncredited)
Night Into Morning (1951) as Drunk (uncredited)
Never Trust a Gambler (1951) as Sunbeam Liquor Store Clerk (uncredited)
Darling, How Could You! (1951) as Cabbie (uncredited)
The Tall Target (1951) as Beamish - Passenger in Club Car (uncredited)
Chain of Circumstance (1951) as Fogel
The Family Secret (1951) as Charlie (uncredited)
The Barefoot Mailman (1951) as Dewey Durgan (uncredited)
The Stooge (1952) as Sam Robertson (uncredited)
A Girl in Every Port (1952) as Drive-In Manager
The Belle of New York (1952) as Presents Angela with Flowers (uncredited)
I Dream of Jeanie (1952) as Mr. Horker
Three for Bedroom "C" (1952) as Alcoholic Train Passenger (uncredited)
She's Back on Broadway (1953) as News Vendor (scenes deleted)
Call Me Madam (1953) as Sen. Wilkins
Scared Stiff (1953) as Man in Hotel Hallway (uncredited)
Ambush at Tomahawk Gap (1953) as Marlowe
Ride, Vaquero! (1953) as Storekeeper (uncredited)
Vice Squad (1953) as Mr. Jenner (uncredited)
Down Laredo Way (1953) as Judge Sully
The Affairs of Dobie Gillis (1953) as Mr. Hammersmith, Book Seller (uncredited)
City of Bad Men (1953) as Old-Timer at Training Camp (uncredited)
The Robe (1953) as Caleb - Wine Merchant (uncredited)
How to Marry a Millionaire (1953) as Mr. Benton (uncredited)
Wicked Woman (1953) as Charlie Borg
Geraldine (1953) as Pop (uncredited)
Lucky Me (1954) as Brown (uncredited)
About Mrs. Leslie (1954) as Mr. Hackley
A Star is Born (1954) as William Gregory (uncredited)
The Adventures of Hajji Baba (1954) as Kerbelai, Hajji's Barber Father (uncredited)
White Christmas (1954) as Train Conductor (uncredited)
20,000 Leagues Under the Sea (1954) as Coach Driver
Crashout (1955) as Doctor Louis Barnes
Kiss Me Deadly (1955) as Doc Kennedy
Jail Busters (1955) as Warden B.W. Oswald
Trial (1955) as Youval (uncredited)
No Man's Woman (1955) as Otto Peterson
Diane (1956) as Court Jester (uncredited)
Fury at Gunsight Pass (1956) as Peter Boggs
Terror at Midnight (1956) as Speegie
The Boss (1956) as Hotel Clerk (uncredited)
Shake, Rattle & Rock! (1956) as Hiram, the funeral director
The Phantom Stagecoach (1957) as Mr. Wiggins
The Vintage (1957) as Voice Dub for Berger (uncredited)
This Could Be the Night (1957) as Charlie (uncredited)
Spook Chasers (1957) as Mike Clancy
The Last Stagecoach West (1957) as Telegrapher (uncredited)
Jailhouse Rock (1957) as Sam Brewster (uncredited)
The Sheepman (1958) as Station Master (uncredited)
The Proud Rebel (1958) as Photographer (uncredited)
Rally 'Round the Flag, Boys! (1958) as Waldo Pike, the Plumber (uncredited)
Ask Any Girl  (1959)  as Janitor in Meg Wheeler's Building (uncredited)
Let No Man Write My Epitaph (1960) as Baldy (uncredited)
Where the Boys Are (1960) as Fairview Motel Manager (uncredited)
Ride the High Country (1962) as Luther Samson (uncredited)
The Music Man (1962) as Train Conductor (uncredited)
The Wheeler Dealers (1963) as Deke (uncredited)
4 for Texas (1963) as Jonas Ansel
Get Yourself A College Girl (1964) as Senator's Chauffeur (uncredited)
Hush...Hush, Sweet Charlotte (1964) as Funeral Director
Dear Brigitte (1965) as Kraft - Man at Computer Lab (uncredited)
Zebra in the Kitchen (1965) as Mr. Richardson
The Sons of Katie Elder (1965) as Mr. Peevey
Don't Worry, We'll Think of a Title (1966) as Diner Customer (uncredited)
A Big Hand for the Little Lady (1966) as Kevin McKenzie (uncredited)
The Big Mouth (1967) as Sanitation Man (uncredited)
Head (1968) as Heraldic Messenger
Butch Cassidy and the Sundance Kid (1969) as Sweetface (uncredited)
The Day of the Wolves (1971) as The Farmer
Legend of the Northwest (1978) (final film role)

Television appearances 

Adventures of Superman (1953, Episode 36, "The Face and the Voice") as Hamlet
Death Valley Days (1953) as Little Oscar
The Life of Riley (1953) as Mr. Cox
The Lone Ranger (1955) as Pete Travis
Alfred Hitchcock Presents (1955-1961) as Cyrus Rutherford / Morton / Newspaperman / Building super / George the Janitor / Lawyer /Gerald Eaton
Father Knows Best (1957, episode 4) as desk clerk
Science Fiction Theatre (1957) as Professor John Husted (S02 E35)Maverick (1957-1960) as Bradley / Mr. VennerDeath Valley Days (1958) as Scrubby in Episode 296Lawman (1959-1961) as Thatcher / Ellery Purvy / OrenGunsmoke (1959-1966) as Mr. Early / Arbuckle / Duffer / OtieBonanza (1959-1967) as Bleeker / Pete / Lafe / Blurry JonesThe Untouchables (1960) as Jocko Monaghan / Mr. MeyerLaw of the Plainsman (1960) as Del MartinMr. Lucky (1960) as Pop MarkelLaramie (1961-1963) as Opie / Clemson Frazer / Wes Snyder - AuctioneerCheyenne (1961) as Matthew BeaselyRawhide (1961) as bartenderPerry Mason (1961-1965) as Hotel Desk Clerk / Asa Cooperman / PawnbrokerMister Ed (1962-1965) as Zoo Attendant / Dr. EvansThe Twilight Zone (1963-1964) as Lapham / Tom PoulterBewitched (1964)The Fugitive (1964) as HoboPetticoat Junction (1965-1970) as Mr. Benton / Hinky MittenflossGreen Acres (1966-1969) as Luke Needlinger / Ira Hatch / WillieThe Jerry Lewis Show (1967)Green Hornet (1967, Episode 20 "Ace in the Hole") as GusThe Mothers-In-Law (1967) as Dean RobertsThe Virginian (1967, "Execution at Triste") as Dean RobertsThe Beverly Hillbillies (1968-1969) as Homer CratchitBatman (1968) as GusGet Smart (1968) as A.J. PfisterLand of the Giants (1968) as AkmanThe Wild Wild West (1968) as ProprietorLove American Style (1970) as Wharton (segment "Love and Those Poor Crusaders' Wives")Mission: Impossible (1971) as Dailey

 Commercial appearances 

 Mandom, Japanese Perfume Commercial (1976) as Hotel Doorman

References

Helton is not listed on the US Army rolls as having received the Distinguished Service Cross in WWI.  This story was probably the result of an overzealous Hollywood agent.

 External links 

young Percy Helton on left in Silver Wings'' (1922)- (University of Washington, Sayre collection)

1894 births
1971 deaths
Male actors from New York City
Burials at Westwood Village Memorial Park Cemetery
American male child actors
United States Army soldiers
American male film actors
American male television actors
United States Army personnel of World War I
20th-century American male actors